Lists of mobile computers

By product type

 Comparison of tablet computers
 Comparison of smartphones
 Comparison of e-readers

Lists that include currently available products

 List of open-source mobile phones
 List of iOS and iPadOS devices
Comparison of Google Pixel smartphones
 Microsoft Surface tablets
 Mobile computers running Android:
 List of BlackBerry products
 List of Google products
 List of Huawei phones
 Comparison of HTC devices
 List of LG mobile phones
 Motorola Moto
 List of Nokia products
 Samsung Galaxy phones and tablets
 List of Sony Ericsson products

Lists without any current products

Comparison of Firefox OS devices
Comparison of Google Nexus smartphones
List of Google Play edition devices
 List of Palm OS devices
 List of Pocket PC Devices
 Comparison of Symbian devices
 List of Windows Phone 8.1 devices
 List of Windows Phone 8 devices
 List of Windows Phone 7 devices
 List of Windows Mobile devices